Alana Michelle Josephs (born November 23, 1989), better known under her stage name Lanz Pierce, is an American rapper, singer, songwriter and recording artist. She was born in Queens, New York and raised in New Jersey.

Early life 
Born in Queens, New York to parents Andrea Josephs, an insurance broker, and Michael Josephs, an attorney, her path towards hip-hop was shaped by her parents' acrimonious divorce when she was six years old. At age 11, she began composing rhymes, influenced by male role models in the industry such as Tupac Shakur, Eminem, DMX, and Nas. Her female influences include Missy Elliott and Lil Kim. Pierce dropped out of school at age 14 and fought for recognition on stage through the underground hip-hop scene. In 2003, Pierce called Quad Studios in Midtown Manhattan numerous times, eventually appearing at its office in person. After impressing the manager with her rhymes, she received an internship but remained an unsigned artist.

Career 
In February 2006, Pierce signed with Interscope, following an acclaimed performance in Chicago at Lollapalooza on the BMI showcase stage. As a songwriter, she contributed to the works of Three 6 Mafia, Focus, Stargate, JR Rotem, Organized Noize, Emile and Syience.

In March 2013, Pierce released first independent EP released her first album, Point of No Return on her own independent label, Innovators&Aviators, which was distributed by Empire.

Discography 
Albums
 Editors Eye (2015)

Eps
 Point of No Return (2013)

References

External links 

 

Jewish American musicians
Jewish rappers
Jewish singers
Singers from New York (state)
People from Forest Hills, Queens
People from Queens, New York
American women hip hop musicians
1989 births
Living people
21st-century American women singers
21st-century American singers
21st-century American Jews